Kerttula is a surname. Notable people with the surname include:

Beth Kerttula (born 1956), American politician
Eevert Kerttula (1894–1962), Finnish gymnast
Erkki Kerttula (1909–1989), Finnish fencer
Jay Kerttula (1928–2020), American businessman and politician

Surnames of Finnish origin